Joseph Carr (Q1 1919 – 31 May 1940) was an English professional footballer who played as a full back in the Football League for Sheffield United.

Personal life
On 16 October 1939, a month and a half after the outbreak of the Second World War, Carr attested in the British Army under the Militia Act. Serving as a gunner in the Royal Artillery, he was killed during the Battle of Dunkirk on 31 May 1940. He is buried at the Oostduinkerke War Cemetery.

Career statistics

References

1919 births
Date of birth missing
1940 deaths
Footballers from Sheffield
Association football fullbacks
English footballers
English Football League players
Sheffield United F.C. players
Royal Artillery soldiers
Military personnel from Sheffield
British Army personnel killed in World War II